A headmaster is a head teacher.

Headmaster or The Headmaster may also refer to:

The Headmaster (play), a 1913 stage farce
The Headmaster (film), a 1921 British silent film
The Headmaster (book), a 1966 biography book of Frank Boyden by John McPhee
Headmaster (TV series), a 1970 American TV series starring Andy Griffith
Headmaster (Transformers)

See also 
 Sōke